Events in the year 1911 in Norway.

Incumbents
 Monarch – Haakon VII

Events
 14 December – Roald Amundsen's Norwegian expedition becomes the first to reach the South Pole.
 Norsk Hydro's second plant opens at Rjukan, four years after its first plant at Notodden.

Popular culture

Sports

 19 June – Molde FK football club is founded.

Music

Film

Literature
 The Olav Duun novel Gamal jord (Old Soil) was published.

Births

January to March
 1 January – Håkon Melberg, linguist (died 1990)
 11 January – Harald Heide Steen, actor (died 1980)
 12 January – Halvor J. Sandsdalen, farmer, journalist, poet, novelist, playwright and children's writer (died 1998).
 16 January – Arne Tuft, cross country skier (died 1989)
 20 January – Andreas Wormdahl, politician (died 2001)
 28 January – Sverre Engen, skier, ski coach, ski area manager and film-maker in America (died 2001)
 31 January – Rigmor Frimannslund Holmsen, ethnologist (died 2006).
 12 February – Charles Mathiesen, speed skater and Olympic gold medallist (died 1994)
 21 February – Erling Fjellbirkeland, research administrator (died 1986).
 3 March – Kristian Henriksen, international soccer player, coach (died 2004)
 5 March – Nils Eriksen, international soccer player and Olympic bronze medallist (died 1975)

April to June
 6 April – Per Tønder, politician (died 2015)
 10 April – Kåre Christiansen, bobsledder (died 1964)
 13 April – Thorstein Treholt, politician and Minister (died 1993)
 14 April – Astrid Løken, entomologist (died 2008)
 20 April – Reidar Andersen, ski jumper and Olympic bronze medallist (died 1991)
 25 April – Hans Beck, ski jumper and Olympic silver medallist (died 1996)
 18 May – Ole Myrvoll, professor in economy, politician and Minister (died 1988)
 19 May – Petter Pettersson, Jr., politician (died 1984)
 27 May – Torolf Elster, newspaper and radio journalist, magazine editor, novelist, crime writer and short story writer (died 2006)
 3 June – Olav Økern, cross country skier and Olympic bronze medallist (died 2000)

July to September
 6 July – Odd Rasdal, long-distance runner (died 1985)
 13 July – Torvald Kvinlaug, politician (died 1977)
 18 July – Claus Marius Neergaard, politician (died 1990)
 22 August – Edvard Hambro, politician and 25th President of the United Nations General Assembly (died 1977)
 23 August – Birger Ruud, ski jumper, twice Olympic gold medallist and three time World Champion (died 1998)
 25 August – Ragnar Haugen, boxer (died 1964)
 10 September – Frithjof Ulleberg, soccer player and Olympic bronze medallist (died 1993)
 12 September – Bjørn Fraser, naval and aviation officer (died 1993)
 15 September – Karsten Solheim, golf club designer and businessman in America (died 2000)
 20 September – Oddleif Fagerheim, politician (died 1999)
 22 September – Inge Einarsen Bartnes, politician (died 1988)
 23 September – Herman Hebler, printmaker and graphic artist (died 2007)
 28 September – Nils Sønnevik, politician (died 1988)

October to December
 1 October – Harald Sandvik, military officer (died 1992)
 12 October – Johannes Lislerud, politician (died 1989)
 15 October – Margith Johanne Munkebye, politician (died 2000)
 2 November – Guri Johannessen, politician (died 1972)
 6 November – Harald Nicolai Samuelsberg, politician (died 1986)
 9 November – Ebba Lodden, politician (died 1997)
 19 November – Harry Haraldsen, speed skater (died 1966)
 13 December – Trygve Haavelmo, economist, awarded the Nobel Memorial Prize in Economic Sciences (died 1999)
 29 December – Alf Martinsen, soccer player and Olympic bronze medallist (died 1988)

Full date unknown
 Henriette Bie Lorentzen, humanist, peace activist, feminist and editor (died 2001)
 Leif Iversen, politician (died 1989)
 Reidar Fauske Sognnaes, Dean of Harvard School of Dental Medicine, forensic scientist (died 1984)

Deaths
 4 January – Oscar Nissen, physician, newspaper editor and politician (born 1843)
 30 March – Sven Oftedal, helped found the Lutheran Free Church (born 1844)
 14 June – Johan Svendsen, composer, conductor and violinist (born 1840)
 2 September – Isak Kobro Collett, politician (born 1867)
 30 October – Ulrik Frederik Christian Arneberg, politician (born 1829)

Full date unknown
 Nils Christian Egede Hertzberg, politician and Minister (born 1827)
 Hans Møller, politician, consul and businessperson (born 1830)
 Harald Smedal, politician and Minister (born 1859)

See also

References

External links

 
Norway
Norway